One Hundred and One Nights is a 1995 French comedy film directed by Agnès Varda. A light-hearted look at 100 years of commercial cinema, it celebrates in vision and sound favourite films from France, Germany, Italy, Japan, and the USA. It was entered into the 45th Berlin International Film Festival.

Plot
With his hundredth birthday approaching and his memory failing, Simon Cinéma hires Camille, a bright young film student, to visit him in his isolated mansion outside Paris for 101 days and relive for him the history of the cinema in which he has been involved all his life. In his opulent seclusion, he models himself on Norma Desmond and his butler on Erich von Stroheim.

They watch clips from his collection, listen to snatches of dialogue and music, and discuss (not too deeply) famous films, directors, and characters. Actors from many countries drop in to visit him, in person or as memories: Marcello Mastroianni, Gérard Depardieu, Jean-Paul Belmondo, Alain Delon, Jeanne Moreau (to whom he was once married), Hanna Schygulla (another former wife), Catherine Deneuve, Robert De Niro, Sandrine Bonnaire, Anouk Aimée, Fanny Ardant, Gina Lollobrigida, and Jane Birkin.

A subplot involves Camille's boyfriend Mica, who is trying with friends to make his first film and decides that the wealthy old man should help finance it. He persuades Vincent, who has been in India for years, to pose as Simon's long-lost grandson and heir. That plan is foiled by Elizabeth Taylor (played by a double), who gets Simon to leave everything for medical research. With Camille, Simon attends the Cannes festival and makes a triumphant return trip to Hollywood. Finally, he agrees to act as a Mafia chief in Mica's film.

Cast

Reviews 
Janet Maslin wrote a favorable review in The New York Times published on 16 April 1999: "Catherine Deneuve, Alain Delon, Robert De Niro and Gerard Depardieu all make brief guest appearances in Agnes Varda's 1995 film.... And those are just the Ds. For this delirious birthday party in honor of filmmaking's first century, Ms. Varda has made every grand allusion she can manage and drawn upon every droppable name and celebrity connection. She creates a whirl of film's greatest hits, an overripe variety show that plays like the ultimate round of Trivial Pursuit....What makes her film as engaging as it is excessive is the obvious affection with which Ms. Varda has collected these memories. The vast array of film clips that surface here have been chosen for their quirkiness or emotional impact rather than for academic reasons. And the loose talk that links otherwise unrelated sequences tends to be playful, despite the ample opportunities for pomposity that this format provides."

Variety'''s Lisa Nesselson gave a mixed review: "Agnes Varda, who has been making movies for 40 of the 100 years that motion pictures have existed, has put everything she knows about filmmaking and much of what she loves about the cinema into A Hundred and One Nights'' [sic]. But despite a star-decked cast and manifest good intentions, Varda's self-described 'divertimento' soars in only a few spots."

References

External links

One Hundred and One Nights at Le Film Guide

1995 films
1995 comedy films
1990s French-language films
Films directed by Agnès Varda
French comedy films
1990s French films